Machadoglyphus is a genus of mites in the family Acaridae.

Species
 Machadoglyphus termitophilus Mahunka, 1963

References

Acaridae